Todd Shell is a former National Football League linebacker for the San Francisco 49ers and a former Arena Football League coach for the San Jose SaberCats, Arizona Rattlers and New York Dragons.

References

External links
 NFL playing stats
 AFL coaching stats

1962 births
Living people
Sportspeople from Mesa, Arizona
American football linebackers
BYU Cougars football players
San Francisco 49ers players
New York Dragons coaches
San Jose SaberCats coaches
Arizona Rattlers coaches